John Bullock Clark Sr. (April 17, 1802 – October 29, 1885) was a politician who served as a member of the United States Congress and Confederate Congress.

Early life and education

John B. Clark Sr. was born in Madison County, Kentucky, a nephew of Congressmen Christopher Henderson Clark and James Clark. He attended the country schools, studied law, and was admitted to the bar in 1824. Establishing a law practice in Fayette, Missouri, he served as clerk of the Howard County courts from 1824 until 1834.

Career 
Clark was commissioned colonel of Missouri Mounted Volunteers during the Black Hawk War in 1832 and was selected to command Missouri state forces during the Missouri Mormon War. Governor Lilburn Boggs addressed his infamous 1838 Extermination Order 44 to Clark, directing that the Mormons be "exterminated, or driven from the state." He was promoted to major general of the state militia in 1848.

Entering politics, Clark was a member of the Missouri House of Representatives in 1850 and 1851. He was appointed as a Democrat to the Thirty-fifth Congress to fill the vacancy caused by the resignation of James S. Green. He was re-elected to the Thirty-sixth and Thirty-seventh Congresses and served from December 7, 1857, until July 13, 1861, when he was expelled for having taken up arms against the Union. He was replaced by William Augustus Hall.

Clark served as a senator from Missouri in the First Confederate Congress and a Representative in the Second Confederate Congress. He also served in the field as a brigadier general in the Missouri State Guard. Eight days prior to his being expelled from the U.S. Congress, Brigadier General Clark fought at the July 5, 1861 Battle of Carthage.

On November 10, 1865, Major General Philip Sheridan recommended the release of Senator Clark from confinement at Fort Jackson due to poor health.

After the war, he practiced law until his death in Fayette, Missouri. He was buried in Fayette Cemetery.

His son John Bullock Clark Jr. served as a general in the Confederate States Army as well as a postbellum U.S. Congressman.

See also

List of American Civil War generals (Acting Confederate)
Extermination order
List of United States representatives expelled, censured, or reprimanded

Notes

References

 Retrieved on 2009-04-20

|-

|-

|-

1802 births
1885 deaths
19th-century American lawyers
19th-century American politicians
American people of the Black Hawk War
Confederate militia generals
Confederate States of America senators
Democratic Party members of the United States House of Representatives from Missouri
Deputies and delegates to the Provisional Congress of the Confederate States
Expelled members of the United States House of Representatives
Members of the Confederate House of Representatives from Missouri
Democratic Party members of the Missouri House of Representatives
Missouri lawyers
Missouri State Guard
People from Fayette, Missouri
People from Madison County, Kentucky